Partially at the behest of the international community, Nauru’s government no longer sanctions certain activities that, while technically legal, could serve to facilitate criminal activity. In 2003, it ended the controversial practice of selling its passports. It also banned offshore banks. In 2005, Nauru was still placed on the Financial Action Task Force on Money Laundering's (FATF) List of Non-Cooperative Countries (NCCTs). A division of the Organisation for Economic Co-operation and Development, the FATF was created in 1989 to address global concerns over the proliferation of money laundering. A generally low rate of petty crime in Nauru has been reported.

References

 
Law of Nauru
Society of Nauru